Bodianus tanyokidus is a species of wrasse. It is found in the Indo-West Pacific region, from the Comoro Islands and Mauritius to southern Japan.

Size

References

Fish of the Pacific Ocean
tanyokidus
Taxa named by Martin F. Gomon
Taxa named by William Dennis Madden
Fish described in 1981